Take It from Me is a 1926 American silent comedy film directed by William A. Seiter and starring Reginald Denny, Blanche Mehaffey, Lee Moran.

Cast
 Reginald Denny as Tom Eggett 
 Blanche Mehaffey as Grace Gordon 
 Ben Hendricks Jr. as Dick 
 Lee Moran as Van 
 Lucien Littlefield as Cyrus Crabb 
 Ethel Wales as Miss Abbott 
 Bertram Johns as Percy 
 Jean Tolley a Gwen Forsythe 
 Tom O'Brien as Taxi Driver 
 Vera Lewis as Mrs. Forsythe

References

Bibliography
 Munden, Kenneth White. The American Film Institute Catalog of Motion Pictures Produced in the United States, Part 1. University of California Press, 1997.

External links

1926 films
1926 comedy films
Silent American comedy films
American silent feature films
1920s English-language films
Universal Pictures films
Films directed by William A. Seiter
American black-and-white films
1920s American films